Avløs is a station on the Kolsås Line (line 3) on the Oslo Metro system. It is between Valler and Haslum, 13.6 km from Stortinget. The station was opened 1 July 1924 as part of the tramway Lilleaker Line. Along with most of the line, Avløs closed for upgrades on 1 July 2006 and its service was temporarily provided by bus. Avløs, among other things, received longer platforms which can accommodate trains with up to six cars like most of the metro system.

The company responsible for public transport in Oslo, Ruter, had the long-term objective of opening the Kolsås Line for Metro use again.

The station reopened on 15 December 2013 and was the terminus of the Kolsås Line until the line to Kolsås was reopened 12 October 2014.

References

Oslo Metro stations in Bærum